Dédestapolcsány is a village in Borsod-Abaúj-Zemplén county, Hungary.

Etymology
Dédes comes from a Slavic personal name Deduš derived from dědъ. Dedus (1240).

Tapolcsány comes from Slovak/Slavic Topoľčany ( - poplar tree, see also Topoľčany) or Tepličany (hot spring or stream, see also Tepličany, now a part of Družstevná pri Hornáde).  Tapolchan (1438).

References

External links 
 Street map 

Populated places in Borsod-Abaúj-Zemplén County